Elżbieta Dzikowska (Międzyrzec Podlaski, 19 March 1937 as Józefa Górska) is a Polish art historian, sinologist, explorer, director and operator of documentary films, the author of many books, television programs, radio broadcasts, articles and exhibitions of contemporary art.

Along with her life partner, Tony Halik, she has made about 300 documentary films all over the world for Polish Television and hosted the popular travel television programme "Pieprz i wanilia" ("Pepper and Vanilla").

Books by Elżbieta Dzikowska 
 Niełatwo być Indianinem, Wydawnictwo Książka i Wiedza, 1976, seria: "Kontynenty"
 Limańskie ABC, Wydawnictwo Iskry, 1982, 
 Tropem złota, Wydawnictwo Ministerstwa Obrony Narodowej, 1970
 Hombre, Wydawnictwo Ministerstwa Obrony Narodowej, 1973
 Vilcabamba - ostatnia stolica Inków, Krajowa Agencja Wydawnicza, 1979
 Czarownicy, Dom Słowa Polskiego, 1991, 
 Polacy w sztuce świata, Rosikon Press, 2001,  (książka wyróżniona przez Polskie Towarzystwo Wydawców Książek tytułem Najpiękniejszej Książki Roku 2000, Nagroda Główna w Konkursie Edycja oraz Nagroda Główna w Plebiscycie Dziennikarzy na Najpiękniejszą Książkę)
 Groch i kapusta, czyli podróżuj po Polsce, tom 1, Rosikon Press, 2004, 
 Groch i kapusta, czyli podróżuj po Polsce, tom 2, Rosikon Press, 2005,  (nagroda Bursztynowego Motyla im. Arkadego Fiedlera za najlepszą książkę podróżniczą 2005 roku)
 Groch i kapusta, czyli podróżuj po Polsce, tom 3, Rosikon Press, 2006, 
 W Sztuce Świata. Polscy artyści, Rosikon Press, 2005, 
 Panek-Gielniak. Życie. Przyjaźń. Sztuka. Korespondencja 1962-1972, Biblioteka Narodowa, 2005,  (z Wiesławą Wierzchowską)
 Uśmiech świata, Rosikon Press, 2006, 
 Groch i kapusta. Podróżuj po Polsce! Południowy zachód, Rosikon Press, 2009, 
 Groch i kapusta. Podróżuj po Polsce! Północny zachód, Rosikon Press, 2009, 
 Groch i kapusta. Podróżuj po Polsce! Północny wschód, Rosikon Press, 2009, 
 Groch i kapusta. Podróżuj po Polsce! Południowy wschód , Rosikon Press, 2009,

Gallery of photos

External links 

 about Groch i kapusta. Podróżuj po Polsce!

1937 births
Living people
Polish explorers
Polish sinologists
Polish travel writers
Recipients of the Gold Medal for Merit to Culture – Gloria Artis
Knights of the Order of Polonia Restituta
Recipients of the Gold Cross of Merit (Poland)